Soul on a String (Tibetan: རྒྱུད་སྐུད་སྟེང་གི་རྣམ་ཤེས) is a 2016 Chinese Tibetan-language adventure film directed by Zhang Yang and co-written by Zhang Yang and Tashi Dawa, based on Tashi Dawa's short stories "Souls Tied to the Knots on a Leather Cord" and "On the Road to Lhasa". It stars Kimba, Choenyi Tsering, Siano Dudiom Zahi, and Yixi Danzeng. The film premiered at the 19th Shanghai International Film Festival on June 15, 2016, and opened in China on August 18, 2017.

Plot
Tabei is a hunter who had killed countless animals. While hunting a deer, he is killed by lightning. But it isn't long before that he is saved by the Gautama Buddha, who orders him to escort a treasure to a holy land of Tibetan place named "Zhangwendi".

Cast
 Kimba as Tabei, a hunter
 Choenyi Tsering as Qiong, a beautiful and lonely shepherdess who is pregnant with Tabei's child
 Siano Dudiom Zahi as Zhandui, elder brother of Guo Ri, who wants to find Tabei for revenge
 Yixi Danzeng as Pu, a mute and Tabei's attendant.
 Gengdeng Pengcuo

Production
Madeng Film Limited Company and Lichenguang International Cultural Media Limited Company purchased the film rights. The script for the film was finished in 2007 written by Tashi Dawa. The film was wrapped in 2014.

Most of the film was shot on location in southwest China's Tibet Autonomous Region.

Release
The film premiered in 19th Shanghai International Film Festival on June 15, 2016, with wide-release in China on August 18, 2017.

Accolades

References

External links
 
 
 

Films directed by Zhang Yang
2016 films
Chinese adventure films
Tibetan-language films
Films about Tibet
Films shot in Tibet
2010s Mandarin-language films